Stert Brook Exposure is a  geological Site of Special Scientific Interest in Potterne parish in Wiltshire, England, notified in 1989. It has rock-types from both north Wiltshire / Oxfordshire and south Wiltshire.

References

Sites of Special Scientific Interest in Wiltshire
Sites of Special Scientific Interest notified in 1989